Chaco is a 2020 Bolivian war drama film directed by  and set in 1934 during the Chaco War. It was selected as the Bolivian entry for the Best International Feature Film at the 93rd Academy Awards, but it was not nominated.

Plot
A company of Bolivian soldiers, led by a German captain, wanders through the dry woods and plains of the Chaco in search of their Paraguayan enemy.

Cast
  as Capitán alemán
 Omar Calisaya as soldado Ticona
 Fausto Castellón as soldado Jacinto
 Raimundo Ramos as cabo Liboro

See also
 List of submissions to the 93rd Academy Awards for Best International Feature Film
 List of Bolivian submissions for the Academy Award for Best International Feature Film

References

External links
 

2020 films
2020 drama films
2020s Spanish-language films
2020 war drama films
Bolivian drama films
Aymara-language films
Quechua-language films
Chaco War films
2020 multilingual films